Cainogenion is a genus of beetles in the family Carabidae, containing the following species:

 Cainogenion clypeale Baehr, 1997
 Cainogenion creberrimum (Blackburn, 1901)
 Cainogenion depressum Baehr, 1997
 Cainogenion ephippiatum (Newman, 1856)
 Cainogenion glabratum Baehr, 1997
 Cainogenion interiore Baehr, 1997
 Cainogenion ipsoides (Westwood, 1837)
 Cainogenion obscurum (Castelnau, 1867)
 Cainogenion parumpilosum Baehr, 1997
 Cainogenion rotundicolle Baehr, 1997
 Cainogenion subopacum (Macleay, 1871)
 Cainogenion tropicum Baehr, 1997

References

Pseudomorphinae